Gail Mitchell, known professionally as Gail Bean, is an American actress. Bean co-starred in the series Paradise Lost and the film Unexpected. She has also acted in Insecure, Love in the Time of Corona, Atlanta, and Detroiters. She is best known for her portrayal of Wanda Bell on Snowfall (2018–present). She is also a cast member on P-Valley's second season.

Life and career
Born Gail Mitchell, she was raised in Stone Mountain, Georgia. She is the youngest of six and the only daughter amongst her parents' children. She first became interested in acting in a drama class she took while she was a student at Stephenson High School. Bean received her bachelor's degree from Valdosta State University, where she joined the sorority Delta Sigma Theta. She enrolled to study accounting but at the urging of one of her professors, she instead pursued acting. Mitchell adopted the stage name Gail Bean due to the nickname "Bean" that she went by as a high school student. 

Bean received positive critical reception for her starring role in the 2015 film Unexpected, which debuted at Sundance Film Festival. In the film she plays a pregnant teen opposite Cobie Smulders. She was named one of 10 Sundance Breakout Stars by TheWrap for her performance. Bean went on to appear in television series including Insecure, Love in the Time of Corona, Detroiters, Chicago P.D., Grey's Anatomy, and Paradise Lost. She gained wider notoriety in 2018 as a main cast member on Snowfall, where she portrays Wanda Bell, a young woman who dates a drug dealer and later struggles with addiction. As of 2022 she is also a recurring cast member on the second season of P-Valley. Bean portrays Roulette, a rebellious new dancer at The Pynk.

Filmography

Film

Television

Video Games

References

External links 
 
 Official Instagram

Year of birth missing (living people)
Living people
21st-century American actresses
African-American actresses
People from Stone Mountain, Georgia
Actresses from Georgia (U.S. state)
Valdosta State University alumni